Rābiʿa al-ʿAdawiyya al-Qaysiyya (714/717/718 — 801 CE) was an Arab  Muslim saint and Sufi mystic and carried her life out as an influential religious figure. She is known in some parts of the world as Hazrat Rabia Basri, Rabia Al Basri or simply Rabia Basri. She set an example respected by Muslims throughout history and is a small piece in the complicated founding of Islam.

Biography
Rābiʻa is said to have been born between 714 and 718 CE (95 and 98 Hijri) in Basra, Iraq, of the Qays tribe. Farid ud-Din Attar, a later Sufi saint and poet, recounted much of her early life.  

She was the fourth daughter of her family and so named Rābiʻa, meaning "fourth". 
According to Fariduddin Attar, whose account is more myth than a narrative of a historical Rābiʿa: when Rābiʻa was born, her parents were so poor that there was no oil in the house to light a lamp, nor even a cloth to wrap her with. Her mother asked her husband to borrow some oil from a neighbor, but he had resolved in his life never to ask for anything from anyone except God. He pretended to go to the neighbor's door and returned home empty-handed. At night Muhammad appeared to him in a dream and told him,"Your newly born daughter is a favorite of the Lord, and shall lead many Muslims to the right path. You should approach the Amir of Basra and present him with a letter in which should be written this message: 'You offer Durood to the Holy Prophet one hundred times every night and four hundred times every Thursday night. However, since you failed to observe the rule last Thursday, as a penalty you must pay the bearer four hundred dinars'".

However, after the death of her father, famine overtook Basra. She parted from her sisters. Rabia went into the desert to pray and became an ascetic, living a life of semi-seclusion. She is often cited as being the queen of saintly women, and was known for her complete devotion as "pure unconditional love of God." As an exemplar among others devoted to God, she provided a model of mutual love between God and His creation; her example is one in which the loving devotee on earth becomes one with the Beloved.

She prayed:"O Lord, if I worship You because of Fear of Hell,then burn me in Hell;

If I worship You because I desire Paradise,then exclude me from Paradise;

But if I worship You for Yourself alone,then deny me not your Eternal Beauty".

Rābiʻa died in her 80s in Basra in 185 AH/801 CE, where her tomb was shown outside the city. However, Rābiʿa's main modern biographer, Rika Elaroui Cornell, says the datings of Rābiʿa's birth and death "come from a much later period and the ultimate source of these dates is unclear." Her life records stem mainly from historical narratives. Rabi’a is thought of today as a saint because of her contributions to Sufism and her devotion to God. In Islamic literature, oral words are seen as valid as written words are. Additionally, with surviving works by other authors confirming her story, she was both a real and impactful Sufi.

Philosophy and Religious Contributions
Often noted as having been the single most famous and influential renunciant women of Islamic history, Rābiʻa was renowned for her extreme virtue and piety. A devoted ascetic, when asked why she performed a thousand ritual prostrations both during the day and at night, she answered:"I desire no reward for it; I do it so that the Messenger of God, may God bless him and give him peace, will delight in it on the day of Resurrection and say to the prophets, 'Take note of what a woman of my community has accomplished'".

She was intense in her self-denial and devotion to God. She never claimed to have achieved unity with Him; instead, she dedicated her life to getting closer to God. As an explanation of her refusal to lift her head toward the heavens [to God] as an act of modesty, she used to say: "Were the world the possession of a single man, it would not make him rich ... [B]ecause it is passing away."

She was the one who first set forth the doctrine of Divine Love known as Ishq-e-Haqeeqi and is widely considered being the most important of the early renunciant, one mode of piety that would eventually become labeled as Sufism.

Contrary to the name, Rabi’a was never appointed a saint because Muslims do not have such titles. However, through years of reinterpretation and westernization, Rabi’a has been donned with the title. 

Rabi’a’s teachings had a lasting impact on the religious world, as noted by many religious scholars. One non-Sufi account by Abu ‘Uthman al-Jahiz referred to her as highly respected, and someone people went to for guidance. Another reference by Abi Tahir Tayfur of Bhagdad remembers her always having something important to say. 

She was well known for having a powerful love for God and devoting her life to him. She was beloved not only by many for her spiritual guidance but for her ethics as well. She pushed the idea of loving God for being God, not for reward or anything. 

Among her most notable qualities besides her devotion to God are her humility and celibacy. Living alone and in love with only God, she is idolized by many for her religious passion and the example she set for the growing Muslim population. She is also said to be the founder of Islamic love mysticism.

Poetry and Myths
Much of the poetry that is attributed to her is of unknown origin. There is no evidence in the historical archive that Rābiʿa ever met Hasan al-Basri; however the following myth, first appearing in Fariduddin Attar's Tadhkirat al-Awliya`, is a common trope in the modern period: After a life of hardship, she spontaneously achieved a state of self-realization. She was chosen by Allah to perform divine miracles. When asked by Shaikh Hasan al-Basri, how she discovered the secret, she responded by stating:"You know of the how, but I know of the how-less."

One of the many myths that surround her life is that she was freed from slavery because her master saw her praying while surrounded by light, realized that she was a saint and feared for his life if he continued to keep her as a slave.

Rābiʿa's main modern biographer, Rika Elaroui Cornell, discovered four main tropes of mythologization, Rābiʿa the Teacher, Rābiʿa the Ascetic, Rābiʿa the Lover, and Rābiʿa the Sufi.

Rābiʿa the Ascetic 

Rābiʿa al-ʿAdawiyya is often mythologized as an essential ascetic, where "the ascetic attains the Nonworld not by rejecting the World but by treating it as unimportant. The essential ascetic avoids the World not because it is evil per se but because it is a distraction from God."

Rabi'a the Teacher 
Rabi’a was said to have a circle of disciples, including Maryam of Basra. Besides her disciples, she is regarded as a mentor to many emerging Muslims and guided people in their journey toward God and Sufi practices. 

While nothing physical is left, her impact on the lives of the people around her can be seen in the stories still told about her. For someone whose physical existence is unproved, the fact that her name is still known and respected today speaks volumes.

Feminist theory based on the life of Rabi'a al-Adawiyya

Several aspects of Sufism suggest that Sufi ideologies and practices have stood as counters to dominant society and its perception of women and the relationships between men and women. The stories detailing the life and practices of Rabi'a al-Adawiyya show a countercultural understanding of the role of gender in society. Her role as a spiritual and intellectual superiority is depicted in several narratives. In a Sufi narrative, Sufi leader Hasan al-Basri explained, "I passed one whole night and day with Rabi'a ... it never passed through my mind that I was a man nor did it occur to her that she was a woman...when I looked at her I saw myself as bankrupt [i.e. as spiritually worth nothing] and Rabi'a as truly sincere [rich in spiritual virtue]." However, she decided to stay celibate in order to leave her womanhood behind and devote herself completely to God.

Anecdotes
One day, she was seen running through the streets of Basra carrying a pot of fire in one hand and a bucket of water in the other. When asked what she was doing, she said, "I want to put out the fires of hell, and burn down the rewards of paradise.  They block the way to Allah. I do not want to worship from fear of punishment or for the promise of reward, but simply for the love of Allah."

Legacy 
There are no artifacts found written by or about Rabi’a during her lifetime. While there are various poems and pieces of writing under her name, the legitimacy of their origin is highly debated. Since there are no primary sources confirming her existence or writing, historians rely on the literature of other religious philosophers that came after her time and who wrote about her legacy. 

Because of the lack of eyewitness accounts and surviving evidence of her life, the “true” Rabi’a is unknown. However, Rabi’a’s importance and legacy remain prominent through tales of her life, modern references, and her standing in Muslim culture. While no physical evidence was found of her, Rabi’a’s story and poetry remain an inspiration to women and Muslim people today.

Rabi’a’s teachings and example are influential for people of her time and Sufis today. It helps narrate what Islam looked like throughout time and shows what influential roles women played in it.

In popular culture
Dilras Banu Begum (1622 – 1657) was the first wife and chief consort of Emperor Aurangzeb, the sixth Mughal emperor. She was given the posthumous title Rabia-ud-Daurani ("Rabia of the Age") in her honour.

The life of Rabia has been the subject of several motion pictures by Turkish cinema. One of these films, Rabia, released in 1973, was directed by Osman F. Seden, and Fatma Girik played the leading role of Rabia.

Rabia, İlk Kadın Evliya (Rabia, The First Woman Saint), another Turkish film on Rabia, also released in 1973 was directed by Süreyya Duru and starred by Hülya Koçyiğit.

Rabia's quote became song in Indonesia, called "Jika Surga dan Neraka tak pernah ada" sung by Ahmad Dhani and Chrisye in Senyawa Album 2004.

The final episode of the comedy show, The Good Place, refers to 8th century Sufi mystic poet Hazrat Bibi Rabia Basri, as one of the many worthies who gets into heaven.

Other Names 
Rabi‘a alMusma‘iyya

Rabi‘a al-‘Adawiyya

Rabi‘a al-Qaysiyya

(the name ‘Adawiyya refers to her clan, and the name Qaysiyya refers to her tribe) 

Like any tale, small pieces of information can spiral and be elaborated upon by different people through the ages. While what we know about Rabi’a is few and far between, it is crucial to be mindful of the human exaggeration or modifications possibly made through the passage of time.

Further reading
 Kayaalp, Pinar, "Rabi'a al-'Adawiyya", in Muhammad in History, Thought, and Culture: An Encyclopedia of the Prophet of God (2 vols.), edited by C. Fitzpatrick and A. Walker, Santa Barbara, ABC-CLIO, 2014, Vol. II, pp. 511–12; 
 Mohammad, Shababulqadri Tazkirah e Hazrat Rabia Basri, Mushtaq Book Corner, 2008
 Rkia Elaroui Cornell, Rabi‘a From Narrative to Myth The Many Faces of Islam’s Most Famous Woman Saint, Rabi‘a al-Adawiyya (Oneworld: London, 2019)

See also
 Zawiyat al-Adawiya, Jerusalem - a tomb venerated as Rabia's
 List of Sufis

References

External links

 Sufimaster.org - Teachings 
 Sufi Teachings-Writings-Rabia-al-Basri

710s births
801 deaths
Year of birth uncertain
8th-century Arabs
8th-century women writers
8th-century Arabic writers
Muslim female saints
Sunni Sufis
Sufi saints
Muslim ascetics
Iraqi philosophers
8th-century Arabic poets
Iraqi Sufis
Iraqi women writers
Iraqi writers
Islamic philosophers
People from Basra
Sufi philosophy
Sufi poets
Philosophers from the Abbasid Caliphate
Iraqi Sufi saints
Women philosophers
Arabic-language women poets
Arabic-language poets
8th-century philosophers
Female Sufi mystics
9th-century Arabic writers
Women poets from the Umayyad Caliphate
Women mystics
8th-century people from the Umayyad Caliphate
Yazidi holy figures